Charles Percival Gartside (28 October 1887 – 11 August 1958) was an Australian politician.

He was born in East Brighton to engineer James Gartside and Georgiana Edgley. He attended Cheltenham State School and became a market gardener at Dingley. On 6 May 1914 he married Eva Lillian Battley, with whom he had two sons. From 1916, in partnership with his brothers, he formed Gartside Brothers vegetable dehydration firm, gradually expanding the business to become a large cannery. From 1922 to 1940 he served on Dandenong Shire Council, with two periods as president (1926–27, 1932–33). In 1937 he was elected to the Victorian Legislative Council as a United Australia Party member for South Eastern Province. From 1948 to 1950 he was Minister of Health. A supporter of Thomas Hollway, he was expelled from the Liberal and Country Party in 1952 and voted against supply to the McDonald Country Party government. He was Minister of Public Works and Prices in the seventy-hour Hollway government that resulted. He remained in the Council as a Hollway supporter until 1955, when he was defeated as a Victorian Liberal Party candidate. Gartside died at Dingley in 1958.

References

1887 births
1958 deaths
United Australia Party members of the Parliament of Victoria
Liberal Party of Australia members of the Parliament of Victoria
Independent members of the Parliament of Victoria
Victorian Liberal Party members of the Parliament of Victoria
Members of the Victorian Legislative Council
20th-century Australian politicians
People from Brighton, Victoria
Politicians from Melbourne